The 2012 Deadly Awards were hosted by Luke Carroll and Casey Donovan at the Sydney Opera House on 25 September 2012. Jessica Mauboy and opera singer Deborah Cheetham performed at the ceremony. The Awards program were broadcast on nationally on SBS One on 30 September 2012.  The event was an annual celebration of Australian Aboriginal and Torres Strait Islander achievement in music, sport, entertainment and community.

Lifetime Achievement
Ella Award for Lifetime Achievement in Aboriginal and Torres Strait Islander Sport: Arthur Beetson (NRL)
Jimmy Little Award for Lifetime Achievement in Aboriginal and Torres Strait Music: The Sapphires – Beverly Briggs, Naomi Mayers, Lois Peeler, Laurel Robinson and Tony Briggs
The Marcia Langton Award For Lifetime Achievement In Leadership: Percy Neal
The Lifetime Contribution Award For Healing The Stolen Generations: Aunty Lorraine Darcy Peeters

Music
Single Release of the Year: Jessica Mauboy  – "Galaxy"
Album Release of the Year: Troy Cassar-Daley – Home
Male Artist of the Year: Gurrumul Yunupingu
Female Artist of the Year: Jessica Mauboy
Band of the Year: The Last Kinection
Most Promising New Talent in Music: Marcus Corowa
Hip Hop Artist of the Year: Yung Warriors
APRA Song of the Year: "Biding My Time", Busby Marou, Writers: Thomas Busby / Jeremy Marou, Publisher: Sony/ATV Music Publishing Australia Pty Ltd

Sport
Sportsman of the Year: Patrick Mills, basketball
Sportswoman of the Year: Bo de la Cruz
Outstanding Achievement in AFL: Lewis Jetta
Outstanding Achievement in NRL: Ben Barba
Most Promising New Talent in Sport: Damien Duncan Hooper (boxing)

The arts
Film of the Year: Mabo
TV Show of the Year: The Straits
Male Actor of the Year: Jimi Bani, playing Eddie Mabo in Mabo
Female Actor of the Year: Deborah Mailman, playing Bonita Mabo in Mabo
Outstanding Achievement in Literature: Ali Cobby Eckermann for Ruby Moonlight
Dancer of the Year: Janet Munyarryun
Visual Artist of the Year: Vernon Ah Kee

Community
Outstanding Achievement in Aboriginal and Torres Strait Islander Health: Boodjari Yorgas Family Care Program
Aboriginal and Torres Strait Islander Health Worker of the Year – John Corowa
Outstanding Achievement in Aboriginal and Torres Strait Islander Employment: Gavin Lester – Boomerang Constructions
Broadcaster of the Year: Natalie Ahmat – NITV News 
Outstanding Achievement in Aboriginal and Torres Strait Islander Education: Napranum Parents and Learning Group (PAL)
Outstanding Contribution To The Stolen Generations: AbSec – NSW
Outstanding Achievement In Cultural Advancement: Tjanpi Desert Weavers – NPY Women's Council

The Sydney Opera House Award
Thelma Plum

References

External links
2012 Deadlys at Vibe

Deadly Awards
The Deadly Awards
Indigenous Australia-related lists